Terri Welles (born Terri Knepper; November 21, 1956) is an American actress and adult model. She first appeared on the cover of the May 1980 issue of Playboy, wearing a flight attendant costume to illustrate a pictorial on stewardesses (Welles was a United Airlines stewardess at the time). She subsequently appeared as a centerfold in the December 1980 issue and was named Playmate of the Year for 1981. Her original pictorial was photographed by Richard Fegley. Welles was the inspiration for the "Bobo Weller" character in the film Star 80.

Career
In 1997 Welles started an online business selling pictures of herself. On her web site she described herself as a former Playboy model and Playmate of the Year. Playboy Enterprises, which was starting up its own online business at this time, sued Welles in 1998 claiming that it had the exclusive right to use of its trademark terms "Playboy" and "Playmate of the Year" for commercial purposes. The outcome of the suit, Playboy Enterprises, Inc. v. Welles, was that virtually all of Welles' use of the terms were considered nominative uses, and did not infringe on Playboy's rights.

Welles closed down her web site on October 31, 2006, with the announcement that it had "been a fun ride".

Personal life
Welles was born in Santa Monica, California. Welles married NHL ice hockey player, Charlie Simmer, in 1981; they divorced in 1986.

See also
 List of people in Playboy 1980–1989
 Playboy Enterprises, Inc. v. Welles

References

External links
 

1956 births
Living people
American actresses
American female adult models
1980s Playboy Playmates
Playboy Playmates of the Year
21st-century American women